Chase Terrace Academy (formerly Chase Terrace Technology College and Chase Terrace High School before that) is a mixed secondary school and sixth form located in the Chase Terrace area of Burntwood in the English county of Staffordshire.

Originally known as Chase Terrace High School, the school acquired specialisms in Design and Technology and in the Visual, Media and Performing Arts and was renamed Chase Terrace Technology College. The school was destroyed by fire in August 2002, and was rebuilt and refurbished by 2004.

Previously a community school administered by Staffordshire County Council, in January 2017 Chase Terrace Technology College converted to academy status and is now sponsored by the Stephen Sutton Multi-Academy Trust.
 
Chase Terrace Academy offers GCSEs and BTECs as programmes of study for pupils, while students in the sixth form have the option to study from a range of A-levels and further BTECs.

Notable former pupils
Stephen Sutton, former blogger and charity activist
Paul Manning, Olympic gold medalist

References

External links
Chase Terrace Academy official website

Secondary schools in Staffordshire
Burntwood
Academies in Staffordshire